Street Gossip is the debut solo studio album by American rapper Foxx. It was released on October 2, 2007 through Trill Entertainment, Asylum Records and Atlantic Records. Recording sessions took place at Trill Studios in Baton Rouge, Louisiana. Production was handled by Jeremy "Mouse" Allen, Bruce "BJ" Rome, Marlon "B Real" Clark and R. Young, with Turk & Mel serving as executive producers. The album features guest appearances from Big Head, Lil Phat, Webbie, Paul Wall, T-Pain and Trey Songz.

The album peaked at No. 144 on the Billboard 200 albums chart, at No. 21 on the Top R&B/Hip-Hop Albums chart, and at No. 12 on the Top Rap Albums chart in the United States. It was supported by a single titled "Not Myself".

Track listing

Personnel
Jonathan Reed – main artist, vocals
D. "Big Head" Johnson – featured artist (tracks: 5, 7)
Melvin Vernell III – featured artist (tracks: 8, 15)
Webster Gradney – featured artist (track 2)
Paul Michael Slayton – featured artist (track 4)
Faheem Rashad Najm – featured artist (track 6)
Tremaine Aldon Neverson – featured artist (track 12)
Jeremy Allen – producer (tracks: 1, 2, 4-6, 8, 10, 15, 16)
Bruce Rome – producer (tracks: 3, 11, 13)
Marlon Clark – producer (tracks: 7, 14)
R. Young – producer (tracks: 9, 12)
David West – mixing
Mark Kidney – mastering
Mel – executive producer
Turk – executive producer
King Yella – photography

Chart history

References

External links 
Street Gossip at AllMusic
Street Gossip at Discogs
Street Gossip by FOXX on iTunes

2007 debut albums
Trill Entertainment albums
Asylum Records albums